Oberson is a surname. Notable people with the surname include:

Swann Oberson (born 1986), Swiss long-distance swimmer
Xavier Oberson (born 1961), Swiss academic

See also
Berson
Roberson (surname)

Surnames of European origin